Pridorozhnoye is the name of several rural localities in Russia:
Pridorozhnoye, Romnensky District, Amur Oblast, a selo in Chergalinsky Selsoviet of Romnensky District, Amur Oblast
Pridorozhnoye, Tambovsky District, Amur Oblast, a selo in Tambovsky Selsoviet of Tambovsky District, Amur Oblast